The First Hannibal Bridge was the first permanent rail crossing of the Missouri River and helped establish Kansas City, Missouri, as a major city and rail center. The increased train traffic resulting from its construction also contributed to the building of Union Depot, the predecessor to the Kansas City Union Station.

Construction started in 1867, shortly after the end of the American Civil War, and was completed in 1869. The completion of the bridge came after a short battle between Leavenworth, Kansas, and the town of Kansas City for the Hannibal & St. Joseph Railroad bridge.

After construction was completed, the population of Kansas City began to grow.

The bridge was designed by Octave Chanute, who also designed the Kansas City Stockyards and was later a pioneer in aviation. After hearing of the proposed bridge at Kansas City, Joseph Tomlinson contacted Chanute and they corresponded on how best to cross the Missouri River. In October 1867, Chanute hired Tomlinson as the superintendent of superstructure. George S. Morison, who would become a leading bridge designer in North America, apprenticed under the supervision of Tomlinson and Chanute during the construction of the bridge. It was a swing bridge that could open in under two minutes, and had an arched truss design. The bridge cost $1 million to build.

The bridge was built for the Hannibal & St. Joseph Railroad by the Keystone Bridge Company. Although the railroad became part of the BNSF Railway, the name "Hannibal" has stuck.

In 1886, the bridge was severely damaged by a tornado that collapsed a middle span. It was reconstructed and its truss structure was altered from an arch design to a traditional truss design.

See also
List of crossings of the Missouri River

References

Bridges in Kansas City, Missouri
Demolished bridges in the United States
Bridges completed in 1869
Octave Chanute
Chicago, Burlington and Quincy Railroad
Buildings and structures in Clay County, Missouri
Railroad bridges in Missouri
Former railway bridges in the United States
1869 establishments in Missouri